Tanapon Sukumpantanasan (born 20 March 2001), better known by his nickname Perth, is a Thai actor and singer. He made his acting debut with his role in Soul Call (2017) and rose to prominence through portraying Ae in Love by Chance (2018).

Early life and education 
Tanapon was born on 20 March 2001 in Bangkok, Thailand with the zodiac sign Pisces, born in the year of the snake and is an only child. He was given the name Wang Junyong (Chinese: 王隽永, pinyin: Wáng Jùnyǒng) by his Chinese fans and his nickname Perth came from a city in Australia.

He's a Christian and he graduated from Saint Dominic School and is currently studying at Srinakharinwirot University, majoring in Innovative Media Arts and Acting and Director Training. His special talents are playing tennis, electone, ukulele, badminton, acoustic and electric Guitar, Taekwon-Do, Thai Boxing, drums and bass but he claims that his favorites are playing tennis and electric guitar.

Career 

Tanapon made his acting debut as Breeze in the 2017 drama series Soul Call. In 2018, he became widely known for his portrayal of Ae Intouch, the male lead in the Thai BL series Love By Chance alongside  Suppapong Udomkaewkanjana who played the role of Pete Pitchaya. Their performance in the series help them gain fame and fans all over East and Southeast Asia and parts of Europe, America, and Latin America.

TEMPT, a six membered boy-group was introduced on 5 January 2019. All six members acted in the series Love By Chance and the original line-up consisted of Katsamonnat Namwirote,  Rathavit Kijworalak, Kirati Puangmalee, Napat na Ranong, Siwat Jumlongkul, and Tanapon. The meaning of their group-name is to attract, convince and captivate: convince others with their talents, attract the attention and captivate the love of people. Due to schedule conflicts TEMPT proceeded to debut without Katsamonat and Siwat on 24th July 2019 with their first single ใช่...ใช่ไหม (Tell Me... Is This Love). They made their first comeback on March 18 with their second single Be With Me Tonight. The band was managed by AttractorTH.

In November 2019, he played the role of Krit in The Stranded Produced by GMM Grammy's Bravo Studios and H2L Media Group in association with Netflix Studios, He starred the series together with Papangkorn Lerkchaleampote, Chutawut Phatrakampol and Oabnithi Wiwattanawarang.

In 2020, Tanapon relived his character as Ae Intouch on Love By Chance 2: A Chance to Love as the supporting role giving the highlight to the first season’s second couple “TinCan” or Phiravich Attachitsataporn and Rathavit Kijworalak.  

On 13 July 2020, Tanapon left his management AttractorTH along with Rathavit Kijworalak and Napat na Ranong due to an "internal matter" though insisted there were no hard feelings behind the decision. worked as freelancer for a year.

He is also currently in a 10 member collaboration boy group under MBO called "Boyfriends", which consist of him, Kanawut Traipipattanapong, Noppakao Dechaphatthanakun, Talay Sanguandikul, Rueangrit Siriphanit, Sapol Assawamunkong, Sittichok Pueakpoolpol, Gavin Duval, Nontanun Anchuleepradit  and Wanarat Ratsameerat. He was paired up with Rueangrit Siriphanit and they released their first single called "อาการงี้ (Hello Doctor)" in September 2020.

In October 2020, it was announced that he will star in the movie “Tell the World I love you” together with Suradet Piniwat. It was supposed to be released on Valentines Day 2021 but was later moved back to 27 January 2022.

On 4 April 2022, Tanapon was announced as the newest GMMTV's talent through its official Instagram and Twitter.

Filmography

Film

Television

Music videos

Discography 
Songs

Awards and nominations

References 

Tanapon Sukumpantanasan
2001 births
Living people
Tanapon Sukumpantanasan